Kjell Jennstig (born February 17, 1960) is a Swedish musician and composer/songwriter. As a musician he is mostly known as guitarist in Swedish motorcycle group, Kenneth & the Knutters. As a composer/songwriter, he has written for a number of Swedish performers, including  Carina Jaarnek, Caracola, Grönwalls, Blender and Caroline Wennergren.

Jennstig has participated three times in the Latvian Eurovision Song Contest preselection competition, Eirodziesma:
 In 2007, his song "Questa Notte", written together with Torbjörn Wassenius and Fransesca Russo and performed by Bonaparti.lv, won the competition. The song was then in the Eurovision Song Contest final in Helsinki where it ended 16th.
 In 2008, his song "You really got me going" ended second. It was written with Leif Goldkuhl and performed by "Aisha" (Aija Andrejeva).
 In 2011, Jennstig had two songs in the Spanish Eurovision Song Contest preselection (Destino Eurovision): "Evangeline" and "Golden Cadillac".
"Evangeline" qualified for the final where it was performed by "Auryn".
In 2013, he had a song in the Swedish ESC preselection, Melodifestivalen. It won its semifinal and went to the final where it ended in tenth place .

The following table shows Kjells Eurovision entries so far:

References

1960 births
Swedish composers
Swedish male composers
Living people